Warren Nisbet is a former wrestler from New Zealand.

He competed at the 1962 British Empire and Commonwealth Games where he won the bronze medal in the men's 52 kg (flyweight) grade.

References

Wrestlers at the 1962 British Empire and Commonwealth Games
Commonwealth Games bronze medallists for New Zealand
Living people
New Zealand male sport wrestlers
Commonwealth Games medallists in wrestling
Year of birth missing (living people)
Medallists at the 1962 British Empire and Commonwealth Games